T-VIPS was founded in 2004 and is headquartered in Oslo, Norway; with a US office in Millburn, New Jersey. T-VIPS was founded by 11 engineers and managers from Tandberg Television with knowledge and experience of the broadcast and telecommunications industry. The T-VIPS team has experience in transport stream multiplexing, processing, monitoring, switching and broadcast video over IP transport, having for a number of years been involved in MPEG over IP contribution solutions and broadband IPTV to the home. It manufactures professional video transport solutions for contribution, distribution and Digital Terrestrial Television (DTT). T-VIPS is involved in the transport of SD, HD and 3D video over IP networks, JPEG 2000 compression, MPEG transport stream processing, transport stream monitoring and switching, remultiplexing, IP-based terrestrial transmission systems and SFN adaption.
T-VIPS solutions are utilized in video broadcast applications such as contribution to terrestrial head-ends, regional and local multiplexing, service filtering, PSIP insertion and SI adaptation, disaster recovery and live events back-haul.

T-VIPS is an active participant in the European Broadcasting Union (EBU) and is a member of several industry organizations, including the Society of Motion Picture and Television Engineers (SMPTE), the Video Services Forum (VSF) and DVB. T-VIPS has worked with these organizations to define industry specifications and its solutions are aligned with these industry standards and are designed for long service life, ease of operation, low power consumption and minimal maintenance requirements.

During IBC 2012 the merger of T-VIPS and Nevion was announced. This merger was then completed in January 2013.

Technologies and innovations
Since the company's launch,  it has developed a range of solutions for video contribution over IP utilizing JPEG2000 compression and has developed solutions specifically designed for digital terrestrial television and the processing of complex transport streams.

T-VIPS products include:
 Video Gateways  a line of products designed for real time contribution and distribution of professional video over IP networks, which includes the JPEG2000 Video Gateways
 Processing & Multiplexing – the cProcessor range is designed to simplify transport stream processing, multiplexing and redundancy handling. The range includes devices for service add/drop, component filtering, extensive PSI/SI/PSIP update and SFN operation
 Monitoring & Switching – the range includes products for redundancy switching including seamless switching and continuous monitoring of transport streams, services, PIDs and PDI/SI/PSIP tables
 Management solution – the solution ensures easy operation of complex broadcasting distribution networks.

Current developments
T-VIPS has won several recent awards including:
 Ranked Number 30 Fastest Growing Technology Company on the Deloitte Technology Fast 500 EMEA 2010
 Red Herring (magazine), Top 100 Europe, April 2009

References

External links
 Official site

Information technology companies of Norway